Mr. Fifteen Balls is a 1998 Italian comedy film directed by Francesco Nuti.

Plot summary 
Francesco is a Tuscan who is very good at playing American pool, so much so that he is nicknamed "Mr. Quindicipalle", for the time he performed the unlikely feat of  fifteen  in one shot, using the wooden handle of a broom as his cue stick. Francesco is also an experienced womanizer, like his recently deceased father. Indeed, Francesco meets the woman of his dreams at his father's funeral – a prostitute who calls herself Sissi. The two fall in love, and so Francesco thinks she might be a lucky charm for him, in his training for a big pool tournament. But Sissi frequently infuriates Francesco, compromising his skill and his training for the tournament.

Cast 

Francesco Nuti as Francesco Di Narnali
Sabrina Ferilli as  Sissi 
Antonio Petrocelli as Giampiero
Novello Novelli as  Maestro
Laura Torrisi as Francesca

References

External links

1998 films
Italian comedy films
1998 comedy films
Films directed by Francesco Nuti
Cue sports films
Films about prostitution in Italy
1990s Italian films